The Gruffalo's Child is a British children's picture book by writer and playwright Julia Donaldson, and illustrated by Axel Scheffler. It is the bestselling sequel to The Gruffalo.

Plot
The story is about the Gruffalo's daughter who, despite her father's warning, sets off into the deep dark wood to find the "big bad mouse", the only thing her father is afraid of. The Gruffalo can not remember what he looks like and describes him as a monster.

During her winter journey, she encounters the tracks of the snake, the owl, and the fox from the previous story, each of whom she first suspects to be the "big bad mouse", but who in turn tell her where she can find the real "big bad mouse". Eventually, concluding she has been tricked by the animals (and perhaps her father), she sadly decides that she "doesn't believe in the 'big bad mouse".

At this point, she encounters the little mouse from The Gruffalo, who previously tricked her father and who her father and the animals were talking about. When she threatens to eat him, he cunningly invites her to meet the "big bad mouse", which he re-creates by using moonlight to project a tremendously enlarged and fearsome shadow to scare her away. Believing the shadow to belong to the real "big bad mouse", the Gruffalo's child flees and returns to the Gruffalo cave with faith in her father restored.

The story repeats the "brains over brawn" theme, the creatures, and the easily flowing rhyme scheme (tetrameter) of its predecessor, The Gruffalo.

Adaptations
The book was adapted for the stage by Tall Stories Theatre Company in 2005, and has toured around the United Kingdom and the rest of the world since then.

The mouse's shadow appearing enlarged is not something that would occur in the real world

References

2004 children's books
British children's books
British picture books
Fantasy books
Sequel books
Children's books adapted into films
Books about mice and rats
Books about foxes
Fictional owls
Fictional snakes
Fiction about monsters
Books about families
Forests in fiction
Donaldson and Scheffler